Siah Khunik (also Romanized as Sīāh Khūnīk and Seyāh Khūnīk) is a village in Neh Rural District, in the Central District of Nehbandan County, South Khorasan Province, Iran. At the 2006 census, its population was 252, in 57 families.

References 

Populated places in Nehbandan County